This is a list of transfers in Serbian football for the 2019–20 winter transfer window.
 Moves featuring Serbian SuperLiga and Serbian First League sides are listed.
 The order by which the clubs are listed is equal to the classification at the mid-season of the 2019–20 season.

Serbian SuperLiga

Red Star Belgrade

In:

Out:

Partizan

In:

Out:

Vojvodina

In:

Out:

Čukarički

In:

Out:

TSC Bačka Topola

In:

Out:

Voždovac

In:

Out:

Radnički Niš

In:

Out:

Spartak Subotica

In:

Out:

Mladost Lučani

In:

Out:

Napredak Kruševac

In:

Out:

Proleter Novi Sad

In:

Out:

Javor Ivanjica

In:

Out:

Radnik Surdulica

In:

Out:

Inđija

In:

Out:

Rad

In:

Out:

Mačva Šabac

In:

Out:

Serbian First League

Grafičar

In:

Out:

Metalac GM

In:

Out:

Zlatibor Čajetina

In:

Out:

Bačka Bačka Palanka

In:

Out:

Kabel

In:

Out:

Kolubara

In:

Out:

Radnički Pirot

In:

Out:

Novi Pazar

In:

Out:

Dinamo Vranje

In:

Out:

Žarkovo

In:

Out:

Radnički 1923

In:

Out:

Trayal

In:

Out:

Zemun

In:

Out:

Sinđelić Beograd

In:

Out:

Smederevo 1924

In:

Out:

Budućnost Dobanovci

In:

Out:

See also
Serbian SuperLiga
Serbian First League

References

Serbian SuperLiga
2019–20
transfers